, or simply , is a Japanese manga series written and illustrated by Chimaki Kuori, a spin-off of the classic Saint Seiya manga created, written and illustrated by Masami Kurumada. Saintia Shō started its serialization in Akita Shoten's Champion Red magazine in August 2013.

A 10-episode original net animation produced by Toei Animation and animated by Gonzo was broadcast from December 2018 to February 2019.

In North America, manga publisher Seven Seas Entertainment licensed the manga for an English-language release in 2017.

Premise
Set during the events of Saint Seiya. Saint Seiya - Saintia Shō follows the traditional central plot common to Kurumada's original work and its derivative works: Athena, the Greek goddess of justice and heroic endeavor, returns when evil consumes Earth, and battles antagonistic deities, the agents of evil, with the assistance of her army of warriors known as Saints, protected by their Cloths, battle armors that represent their guardian constellations. The main character in the series is a young female Saint named Shō, who protects Athena and her Sanctuary from the attack of Goddess of Discord, Eris.

Characters
The series introduces new characters and features many from Kurumada's original manga and Next Dimension. Voice actors are provided when the character appeared in an accompanying drama CD series.

Saintia

One of the Saintia of Okinawan origin, Athena's personal bodyguard Saints, who wears the Equuleus Bronze Cloth.

Shōko's elder sister and previous Equuleus Saintia. She also mastered the Equuleus Meteor Punches. Like her sister, she is the daughter of Olivia.

Saori's personal secretary from Belgium, who is a Saintia wearing the Delphinus Bronze Cloth.

A Singaporean Saintia who wears the Ursa Minor Bronze Cloth.

A long-haired Ukrainian Saintia who wears the Northern Crown Bronze Cloth. After having been poisoned by Eris in the past, she has begun working directly with the Pope against Saori's wishes.

A short-haired Chilean Saintia wearing the Cassiopeia Bronze Cloth who wishes to one day become a Gold Saint.

Athena's circle

She has stopped the ambitions of evil deities since the ages of myth, assisted by her Saints. Although she’s received elite education since her childhood, however, she’s still in her teens. As such, she attends at the Meteros Academy in formality, and also serves as its student council president.

Saori's adopted grandfather.

Saori's butler.

Bronze Saints
Unicorn Jabu, Pegasus Seiya, Dragon Shiryū, Andromeda Shun, Cygnus Hyōga, Phoenix Ikki, Lionet Ban, Wolf Nachi, Bear Geki, and Hydra Ichi appear in Saint Seiya: Saintia Shō.

Silver Saints

The Scutum Silver Saint.

The Crux Silver Saint.

The Pavo Silver Saint, injured during the revolt in Athena's sanctuary, thirteen years earlier and confined to a wheelchair. She agrees to train Sho to become a Saint, and aids the Saintias at various times in the story.

The Crater Silver Saint, saved Mayura after she was attacked by Capricorn Shura. He returns as a Dryad.

Canis Major Sirius, Hound Asterion, Sagitta Ptolemy, Eagle Marin, and Ophiuchus Shaina also appear in Saint Seiya: Saintia Shō.

Gold Saints

One of the twelve Gold Saints of Athena, virtuous and prideful. He saved Shōko's life in the past.

Regarded as the pride of Sanctuary along Scorpio Milo, the Leo Gold Saint, whose heart burns with loyalty towards Athena.

The Gemini Gold Saint who conspired to take over Sanctuary. He somehow saved Katya's life and appears impersonating the true Pope of Sanctuary.

Sagittarius Aiolos, Pisces Aphrodite, Cancer Deathmask, Capricorn Shura, Aquarius Camus, Aries Mu, Taurus Aldebaran, and Virgo Shaka also appear in Saint Seiya: Saintia Shō.

Antagonists

The evil goddess of discord, mortal enemy of Athena since the ages of myth.

One of the hundreds of orphans who had been sent across the world to become a Saint, only to be tainted by Eris and become a Ghost. He was one of Jabu's friends as a child.

The fallen Orion Silver Saint.

Dryads

Warriors protecting Eris. They are generally humans who have died but offered their souls to Eris and given a second life.

The leader of the Dryads.

A young woman in Gothic Lolita dress who carries around a teddy bear named  who she talks to.

The only male Dryad.
Attack: Despair Bite

Harmonia is a guide & prevents intruders from entering the Garden of Eden
Attack: Breath of Paradise - an attack that turns the opponent into flowers and become a part of Garden of Eden

Support characters

Young disciples of Mayura.

Shoko's best friend.

Media

Manga
Saint Seiya: Saintia Shō is written and illustrated by Chimaki Kuori. Kuori is known by her work on the manga adaptation of the Gundam SEED anime and in the Kimi no Kaeru Bashō manga series. Saintia Shō started its serialization in Akita Shoten's Champion Red magazine on August 19, 2013. 

North American manga publisher Seven Seas Entertainment licensed the manga in 2017.

On July 19, 2022, a side-story spin-off manga by Kuori began serialization in Champion Red.

Volume list

Anime
An original net animation has been announced. The series began airing on December 10, 2018, and ended on February 18, 2019. The series is produced by Toei Animation and animated by Gonzo and directed by Masato Tamagawa, with Ikuko Takahashi handling series composition. Keiichi Ishikawa and Ayana Hishino handled character designs. Toshihiko Sahashi is composing the series' music. Toei Animation produced the series. The opening theme song is "The Beautiful Brave", performed by Aina Suzuki, Mao Ichimichi, Inori Minase, and Megumi Nakajima. The series is simulcast by Crunchyroll.

Notes

References

External links
 

2018 anime ONAs
2021 comics endings
Akita Shoten manga
Crunchyroll anime
Eris (mythology)
Gonzo (company)
Magical girl anime and manga
Saint Seiya
Science fiction anime and manga
Seven Seas Entertainment titles
Shōnen manga